The Nave is a river in France,  in the department of Pas-de-Calais.

References

Rivers of France
Rivers of the Pas-de-Calais
Rivers of Hauts-de-France